is a passenger railway station in located in the city of Kadoma, Osaka Prefecture, Japan, operated by the private railway company Keihan Electric Railway.

Lines
Furukawabashi Station is served by the  Keihan Main Line, and is located 10.8 km from the starting point of the line at Yodoyabashi Station.

Station layout
The station has two elevated side platforms, with the station building underneath.

Platforms

Adjacent stations

History
The station was opened on April 15, 1910

Passenger statistics
In fiscal 2019, the station was used by an average of 21,929 passengers daily.

Surrounding area
Kadoma Citizens' Culture Center Lumiere Hall
 Kadoma City Hall

See also
List of railway stations in Japan

References

External links

Official home page 

Railway stations in Japan opened in 1910
Railway stations in Osaka Prefecture
Kadoma, Osaka